441 Tactical Fighter Squadron was a unit of the Canadian Forces. It was originally formed as a unit of the Royal Canadian Air Force (RCAF) during the Second World War.  The squadron operated the McDonnell Douglas CF-18 Hornet fighter jet from CFB Cold Lake in Alberta, Canada.  It was deactivated in 2006.

History

No. 125 (Fighter) Squadron was formed on 20 April 1942 at Sydney, Nova Scotia and flew Hurricanes as part of RCAF Eastern Air Command. It was renumbered  No. 441 Fighter Squadron when it transferred overseas to RAF Station Digby, Lincolnshire, England, on 8 February 1944.  It was posted to airfields in England, France, and Belgium throughout the Second World War, flying the Supermarine Spitfire.  When the squadron returned to England it was disbanded on 7 August 1945.

No 441 Squadron reformed at RCAF Station St. Hubert on 1 March 1951 and went to No 1 Wing, then located at RAF North Luffenham, in Rutland, England on 13 February 1952.  The squadron was temporarily situated at 3 Wing Zweibrücken on 21 December 1954, before moving to their intended destination, RCAF Station Marville, France.  They were deactivated (disbanded) on 1 September 1963 at Marville and then reactivated (reformed) as No 441 Strike/Attack squadron on 15 September 1963, then moved with 1 Wing to Canadian Forces Base Lahr in April 1967.  In 1971 the squadron moved to CFB Baden-Soellingen and changed its name to 441 Tactical Fighter Squadron. They disbanded again in 1986 and then finally reformed at 4 Wing Cold Lake on 26 June 1986.

On 6 July 2006, No 441 Squadron was once again stood down (disbanded), and its crew amalgamating with 416 Tactical Fighter Squadron at CFB Cold Lake and re-formed as 409 Tactical Fighter Squadron.  The squadron's colours and battle honours were placed in Sydney, Nova Scotia, where it first operated.

References

External links

 History of 441 Squadron at DND website
 No. 441 Squadron at Canadianwings.com

Royal Canadian Air Force squadrons
Canadian Forces aircraft squadrons
Military units and formations disestablished in 2006